Shane Mumford (born 5 July 1986) is a former professional Australian rules footballer who most recently played for the Greater Western Sydney Giants in the Australian Football League (AFL). He has also previously played for the Geelong Football Club and the Sydney Swans. He was a part of Sydney's 2012 premiership team.

Early career
In 2006, Mumford was the recipient of the Bunyip Football Club best and fairest award, as well as being the runner-up for the Ellinbank & District Football League medal. After being made aware of his abilities by Geelong VFL player Jason Davenport, who was also in the AFL side as a rookie, Geelong's VFL side welcomed Mumford into their ranks for the 2007 season. It became quite a disappointing season for Mumford, only playing in six games for the premiership winning side, (being replaced by Steven King for the VFL Grand Final, and then the next week, Steven King replaced Mark Blake in the 2007 AFL Grand Final), but his pure rucking ability won over the Geelong recruiters, who then drafted him with their last pick (57) in the 2007 Rookie Draft.

AFL career

Geelong (2008–2009) 
After being drafted, Mumford showed up to pre-season training having re-invented himself, losing 20 kg and improving his fitness levels. Mumford was elevated from Geelong's rookie list on 23 April 2008, due to long-term injury of Matthew Egan, and was then immediately named to play in his first match in round 6 - the following weekend. He replaced fellow ruckman Trent West to take part in Geelong's one-point win over Fremantle at Subiaco.

After a good season in 2009, where he was replaced in the side by ruckman Mark Blake towards the end of the year, Mumford accepted a deal from the Sydney Swans which saw him move to the Harbour City on a three-year million dollar deal (which was extended to four years).

Overall, Mumford played in 18 of 22 regular season matches and was overlooked for the 2009 AFL Grand Final, which was won by the Cats.

Sydney (2010–2013) 
The Swans had high expectations of Mumford following Mark Seaby's injury. During 2010 the Swans were impressed with Mumford's improvement considering in 2009 he was only a Geelong Rookie. Mumford was named in the 44-man squad from which All-Australian selection would be made but narrowly missed out when the actual team of 22 was chosen. Mumford finished second in the 2010 Sydney Swans Bob Skilton Medal, 9 votes behind Kieren Jack.

Mumford was suspended for two weeks in his return to Geelong in round 7 following a spear tackle on Gary Ablett Jr., in a match Sydney lost by 67 points. Mumford again got into trouble for a similar tackle against Carlton in round 16, but no tribunal action was taken.

Mumford returned against Hawthorn in round 10, being one of the Swans' best players as they lost by just two points, despite outscoring the Hawks by 11 goals to 10. His best game for the Swans came against Essendon the week after, with a season-high 46 hitouts against the Bombers whose ruckman David Hille was injured in the same match.

Mumford injured his knee in the Swans' round 21 win over the Western Bulldogs and as a result missed the round 22 win over the Brisbane Lions.

At the end of the 2010 season Shane Mumford was third in the AFL for hitouts despite missing three matches due to suspension and a knee injury.

Another strong start to the year set Mumford up for a successful 2nd season at the Swans in 2011. Unfortunately injury and suspension didn't allow him to have as good a year as in 2010 when he finished runner up in the Bob Skilton Medal. He still managed to finish 8th in the 2011 count however, underlining his importance to the side and the quality and consistency of his play when he is fit.

Coincidentally, his first AFL game was against the same club and he opposed the same ruckman, Aaron Sandilands.

Greater Western Sydney (2014–2017, 2019–2021) 
He debuted for the club against his old side in round 1, 2014, and despite missing five matches early in the season due to a knee injury, he won the club's best and fairest award at the end of an improved season for the club.

After both Mumford and the Giants had a strong start to the season in 2015, the ruckman suffered a serious ankle injury against  at the Melbourne Cricket Ground in round 11. The injury ended his season.

In round two against , Mumford pulled off what could possibly be "the greatest AFL hit of all time" when he took out Mitch Duncan with a solid shirtfront in the third quarter. Despite the nature of the hit, it later went unpunished by the Match Review Panel. At the conclusion of the 2017 season, he retired from AFL football. 
In 2018, Mumford took the position of ruck coach with GWS before coming out of retirement as a supplemental selection. In 2019, he played a total of 20 games for GWS during the home and away season and all finals matches, including the Grand Final loss to Richmond.

Personal life
Mumford is married to Eva Konta, the sister of British tennis player Johanna Konta. The pair have two children.

Post AFL 
After retiring, Shane became a ruck coach and an ambassador at the GWS Giants.

On 21 October 2018, video emerged of Mumford snorting a white substance, believed to be Cocaine. GWS released a statement saying they would support Shane and treat the issue as a health problem. GWS stated the events occurred when Mumford succumbed to a season ending injury in 2015.

Statistics
 Statistics are correct to round 8, 2020

|- style="background-color: #EAEAEA"
! scope="row" style="text-align:center" | 2008
|style="text-align:center;"|
| 41 || 3 || 0 || 0 || 5 || 11 || 16 || 3 || 1 || 0.0 || 0.0 || 1.7 || 3.7 || 5.3 || 1.0 || 0.3
|-
! scope="row" style="text-align:center" | 2009
|style="text-align:center;"|
| 41 || 18 || 3 || 1 || 35 || 127 || 162 || 37 || 71 || 0.2 || 0.1 || 1.9 || 7.1 || 9.0 || 2.1 || 3.9
|-style="background:#eaeaea;"
! scope="row" style="text-align:center" | 2010
|style="text-align:center;"|
| 41 || 21 || 4 || 3 || 75 || 186 || 261 || 45 || 101 || 0.2 || 0.1 || 3.6 || 8.9 || 12.4 || 2.1 || 4.8
|-
! scope="row" style="text-align:center" | 2011
|style="text-align:center;"|
| 41 || 19 || 11 || 2 || 90 || 147 || 237 || 64 || 94 || 0.6 || 0.1 || 4.7 || 7.7 || 12.5 || 3.4 || 4.9
|-style="background:#eaeaea;"
! scope="row" style="text-align:center" | 2012
|style="text-align:center;"|
| 41 || 17 || 12 || 4 || 60 || 115 || 175 || 52 || 75 || 0.7 || 0.2 || 3.5 || 6.8 || 10.3 || 3.1 || 4.4
|-
! scope="row" style="text-align:center" | 2013
|style="text-align:center;"|
| 41 || 22 || 9 || 8 || 67 || 178 || 245 || 58 || 95 || 0.4 || 0.4 || 3.0 || 8.1 || 11.1 || 2.6 || 4.3
|-style="background:#eaeaea;"
! scope="row" style="text-align:center" | 2014
|style="text-align:center;"|
| 41 || 16 || 4 || 2 || 55 || 150 || 205 || 33 || 93 || 0.3 || 0.1 || 3.4 || 9.4 || 12.8 || 2.1 || 5.8
|-
! scope="row" style="text-align:center" | 2015
|style="text-align:center;"|
| 41 || 11 || 1 || 3 || 31 || 102 || 133 || 25 || 71 || 0.1 || 0.3 || 2.8 || 9.3 || 12.1 || 2.3 || 6.5
|-style="background:#eaeaea;"
! scope="row" style="text-align:center" | 2016
|style="text-align:center;"|
| 41 || 23 || 3 || 2 || 47 || 208 || 255 || 54 || 133 || 0.1 || 0.1 || 2.0 || 9.0 || 11.1 || 2.4 || 5.8
|-
! scope="row" style="text-align:center" | 2017
|style="text-align:center;"|
| 41 || 21 || 5 || 1 || 48 || 171 || 219 || 33 || 117 || 0.2 || 0.1 || 2.3 || 8.1 || 10.4 || 1.6 || 5.6
|-style="background:#eaeaea;"
! scope="row" style="text-align:center" | 2019
|style="text-align:center;"|
| 41 || 20 || 0 || 3 || 58 || 132 || 190 || 26 || 84 || 0.0|| 0.2 || 2.9 || 6.6 || 9.5 || 1.3 || 4.2
|-
! scope="row" style="text-align:center" | 2020
|style="text-align:center;"|
| 41 || 4 || 1 || 0 || 5 || 24 || 29 || 6 || 11 || 0.3 || 0.0 || 1.3 || 6.0 || 7.3 || 1.5 || 2.8
|-style="background:#eaeaea;"
|- class="sortbottom"
! colspan=3| Career
! 196
! 53
! 29
! 579
! 1559
! 2138
! 441
! 952
! 0.3
! 0.2
! 3.0
! 8.0
! 10.9
! 2.3
! 4.9
|}

References

External links

1986 births
Living people
Geelong Football Club players
Sydney Swans players
Sydney Swans Premiership players
Greater Western Sydney Giants players
Australian rules footballers from Victoria (Australia)
Kevin Sheedy Medal winners
One-time VFL/AFL Premiership players